The 2005 SCSA Season was the 5th season of United Kingdom-based NASCAR style stock car racing, originally known as ASCAR. From this season, 'Stock Car Speed Association' was adopted as the new brand of the series.

Teams and drivers

Race calendar

All races were held at the Rockingham Motor Speedway in Corby, Northamptonshire.

The season consisted of six meetings of two races taking place on the first Sunday of each month from May to October. The grid for the opening race of each meeting was set by a qualifying session with the second race grid being set by the finishing order of the first.

A meeting at the EuroSpeedway in Germany was scheduled for late August but was cancelled due to concerns with travel costs.

Final points standings

The 2005 season saw a change in the points system. Rather than every driver taking the start of the race being eligible for full points as before, now only those that complete at least 60% distance and are running at the end of the race get full points for their finishing position. Anyone that completes less than 60% race distance scores 10 points as long as they take the start and are not excluded from the final result.

References

External links
 SpeedFreaks 2005 archive

Stock car racing in the United Kingdom
ASCAR